The Batalha River is a 167 km long river of São Paulo state in southeastern Brazil. It is a left hand tributary of Tietê River.

See also
List of rivers of São Paulo

References

Brazilian Ministry of Transport

Rivers of São Paulo (state)
Tributaries of the Tietê